Bács is a Hungarian personal name. It is still used today, although not frequently. Other forms are Bacsa, Bacskó, Bacsó.

Etymology

Hungarian linguists claim that the word was derivation from the Old Turkic baya dignitary. Its languageal form was Bácsa, written as Bacha. A similar word meaning chief of the shephards was borrowed from Paleo-Balkanic, Romanian, or Slavic languages. The sounding of the two words became the same as the last "a" was dropped from the personal name. Hungarian authors claim that most Hungarian place names, for example Bácsa in Transdanubia, Hungary, weren't derivation from the Slavic-Vlach expression but from the personal name with a different language.

History

In the early Árpádic age (11-13th centuries) Bács/Bácsa was a common Hungarian personal name. One member of the Aba clan, Baach, the brother of Both and Tekus, was the ancestor of the Tornay family in the 13th century. In the second half of the 13th century another Bács was the comes of Trencsén county. Hungarian historians assume that the town of Bač (Hungarian: Bács) in present-day Serbia was also named after a person called Bácsa, probably the first comes of Bács county. Other place names with the word are scattered all over the former Kingdom of Hungary and the Balkans.

Today Bács, Bacsó and Bacsa are more often used as surnames in Hungary. Famous people with these surnames are director Péter Bacsó, painter András Bacsa, and Egyptologist Tamás Bács.

Notes

See also

 Bač - a similar Serbian/Slavic name with a different language.

Hungarian given names
Hungarian-language surnames
Hungarian culture